The 2017 Women's Euro Winners Cup was the second edition of Women's Euro Winners Cup, an annual continental beach soccer tournament for top European women's clubs. Organised by Beach Soccer Worldwide (BSWW), the championship is the sport's version of the UEFA Women's Champions League in association football.

Held in Nazaré, Portugal, from 30 May to 4 June 2017 in tandem with the men's edition, the event started with a round robin group stage. At its conclusion, the best teams progressed to the knockout stage, a series of single elimination games to determine the winners. Consolation matches were also played to determine other final rankings. 

Swiss club Grasshoppers were the defending champions, but failed to qualify. The tournament was won by Swiss team Havana Shots Aargau who beat England's Portsmouth in the final to win their first European title.

Russians WFC Zvezda were the only team to finish in the top four again having done so in last year's first edition.

Participating teams
20 teams entered the tournament (an increase from 12 in the inaugural edition) – the top-level domestic beach soccer league/championship champions plus, for some countries, other top non-champions clubs from the nation indicated.

1. Withdrew after the draw

Draw
The draw to split the 20 teams into five groups of four took place on 4 April in the host city of Nazaré, Portugal alongside the men's competition draw.

As the club representing the host association of Portugal, AF Leiria were assigned to Group A. Four other teams were seeded (Beachkick Ladies Berlin, Havana Shots Aargau, WFC Neva, Terracina Ladies) and each assigned to one the remaining groups. The teams were seeded because their national association's club finished in the top four in the previous edition in 2016.

Clubs from the same country could not be drawn into the same group.

Group stage
Matches took place at the Estádio do Viveiro, on one of three pitches as stated.

All times are local, WEST (UTC+1).

Group A

Group B

Group C

Group D

Group E

Ranking of second placed teams
The three best runners-up advanced to knockout stage. The ranking of the five runners-up was determined on goal average. Since Group E consisted of three teams, for the runners-up from the other groups (A, B, C, D), their results against the teams finishing in fourth place in their group were discounted for this ranking.

9th–16th place play-offs
From the group stage, the five teams finishing in third place, plus the two-worst runners-up and the best fourth placed team were knocked out of title-winning contention, receding to play in consolation matches to determine 9th through 16th place in the final standings.

9th–16th place quarter-finals

Semi finals

13th–16th place

9th–12th place

Finals

15th place play-off

13th place play-off

11th place play-off

9th place play-off

Knockout stage
The five group winners and best three runners-up progressed to the knockout stage to continue to compete for the title.

Quarter-finals
The losers receded to play in consolation matches to determine 5th through 8th place in the final standings.

The winners proceeded to continue to compete for the title.

Semi finals

5th–8th place

1st–4th place

Finals

7th place play-off

5th place play-off

3rd place play-off

Final

Awards

Final standings

See also
2017 Euro Winners Cup (men's edition)

External links
Women's Euro Winners Cup 2017, at Beach Soccer Worldwide
Euro Winners Cup Women 2017 , at beachsoccerrussia.ru (in Russian)

References

Women's Euro Winners Cup
Euro
2017
2017 in beach soccer
Nazaré, Portugal
May 2017 sports events in Europe
June 2017 sports events in Europe